The 2016 BYU Cougars men's soccer team is part of the BYU Athletics program but does not play in a college conference. Instead they are competing in the 2016 USL Premier Development League. The Cougars are coached by first year head coach Brandon Gilliam. In addition to a new coach, BYU moves from the Mountain Division of the PDL to the Central Pacific division. The Mountain Division was folded after the Real Colorado Foxes franchise folded.

Media

Television & Internet Streaming
All BYU Cougars home games are streamed live on YouTube.

Regular season

Orange County Blues U–23

Golden State

Las Vegas

Burlingame
Broadcasters: Chad Sackett & Stephen Pemberton (YouTube)

San Francisco
Broadcasters: Carla Swensen-Haslam & Daniel Haslam (YouTube)

San Francisco
Broadcasters: Chad Sackett & Matt Bain (YouTube)

Las Vegas
Broadcasters: Carla Swensen-Haslam & Daniel Haslam (YouTube)

Fresno
Broadcasters: Chad Sackett (YouTube)

Fresno
Broadcasters: Carla Swensen-Haslam & Daniel Haslam (YouTube)

San Francisco
Broadcasters: Charles Wollin, Mike Geddes, & Shelley Alingas (YouTube)

Burlingame

Fresno
Broadcaster: Jason Phillips & Adrian Luevano (YouTube)

Burlingame

Golden State
Broadcasters: (YouTube)

Roster

Standings

References

2016 in sports in Utah
USL League Two seasons